Innocente Alessandri (born c. 1740) was an Italian engraver, born in Venice, who studied with Francesco Bartolozzi, before that artist left Italy.

His prints include  Virgin Mary, with the guardian angel and the souls in Purgatory  after Sebastiano Ricci; four prints, representing Astronomy, Geometry, Music, and Painting, after Domenico Maggiotto; a Virgin Mary with a glory of angels after Giambattista Piazzetta; The Annunciation, after François Lemoyne; and fourteen landscapes and a Flight into Egypt  after Marco Ricci.

References
 Alessandri, Innocente, Scattaglia, Pietro, Descrizioni degli animali: corrispondenti alle cinquanta figure contenute in questo ... volume de' quadrupedi, 1771.
 Volume 1 from Internet Archive  
  Volume 2 from Internet Archive
  Volume 3 from Internet Archive
  Volume 4 from Internet Archive

Sources

Italian engravers
Painters from Venice
18th-century Venetian people